The Baronetcy of Mainwaring of Over-Peover has twice been created for members of the family of Mainwaring of Over-Peover, Cheshire. It was created on 22 November 1660 by Charles II on his restoration, for Thomas Mainwaring, High Sheriff of Cheshire in 1657 and Knight of the Shire otherwise Member of Parliament for Cheshire in 1660. The baronetcy was extinct on the death of the 4th Baronet. However his widow remarried and her son by the second marriage Thomas Weterall eventually inherited the Mainwaring Cheshire estate and changed his surname to Mainwaring. The baronetcy was recreated in the Baronetage of the United Kingdom on 26 May 1804 for Henry Mainwaring, son of Thomas Weterall Mainwaring. It was extinct on the death of the 5th Baronet in 1934.

Mainwaring of Over-Peover (1660)
 Sir Thomas Mainwaring, 1st Baronet (1623–1689) Member of Parliament for Cheshire 1660
 Sir John Mainwaring, 2nd Baronet (1656–1702). Member of Parliament for Cheshire 1689–1702.
 Sir Thomas Mainwaring, 3rd Baronet (1681–1726)
 Sir Henry Mainwaring, 4th Baronet (1726–1797). Extinct on his death

Mainwaring of Over-Peover (1804)
 Sir Henry Mainwaring, 1st Baronet (1782–1860)
 Sir Harry Mainwaring, 2nd Baronet (1804–1875)
 Sir Stapleton Thomas Mainwaring, 3rd Baronet (1837–1878)
 Sir Phillip Tatton Mainwaring, 4th Baronet (1838–1906)
 Sir Henry Stapleton Mainwaring, 5th Baronet (1878–1934). Extinct on his death

References

Extinct baronetcies in the Baronetage of England
Extinct baronetcies in the Baronetage of the United Kingdom